Celia may refer to the following footballers who have played mononymously:
Celia Jiménez (born 1995), Spanish footballer
Célia Šašić (born 1988), German footballer

See also
Raffaele Celia (born 1999), Italian footballer
Celia (given name)

Disambiguation pages with (qualified) titles